The 1939–40 LFF Lyga was the 19th season of the LFF Lyga football competition in Lithuania.  It was abandoned.

Autumn

Spring

Kaunas Group

Žemaitija Group

References
RSSSF

LFF Lyga seasons
Lith
1940 in Lithuanian football
1939 in Lithuanian football